Riyaz Ahmad (3 November 1958 – 29 April 2021) was an Indian politician and a member of the Sixteenth Legislative Assembly of Uttar Pradesh in India. He represented the Pilibhit constituency of Uttar Pradesh and was a member of the Samajwadi Party political party.

Early life and  education
Riyaz Ahmad was born in the Pilibhit district. He attended the Kumaun University & University of Allahabad and attained MA & M.Com degrees.

Political career
Riyaz Ahmad was a MLA for five terms. He represented the Pilibhit constituency and was a member of the Samajwadi Party political party.

Posts held

See also
 Sultanpur (Assembly constituency)
 Uttar Pradesh Legislative Assembly

References 

1958 births
2021 deaths
Samajwadi Party politicians
Uttar Pradesh MLAs 1980–1985
Uttar Pradesh MLAs 1989–1991
Uttar Pradesh MLAs 2002–2007
Uttar Pradesh MLAs 2007–2012
Uttar Pradesh MLAs 2012–2017
People from Pilibhit district
University of Allahabad alumni
Deaths from the COVID-19 pandemic in India